Southern Oregon PBS (SO PBS, formerly Southern Oregon Public Television or SOPTV) is the PBS member network for most of the southwest region of the U.S. state of Oregon. It operates KSYS (channel 8) in Medford and full-time satellite KFTS (channel 22) in Klamath Falls. Studios are located on South Fir Street in downtown Medford. KSYS' transmitter is located on King Mountain, while KFTS' transmitter is atop Stukel Mountain.

History
In 1965, Oregon Educational Broadcasting, forerunner of Oregon Public Broadcasting, persuaded the Federal Communications Commission (FCC) to reassign channel 8 from Brookings to Medford. OEB intended to make channel 8 the third station in its television network, which at that time included flagship KOAC-TV in Corvallis and KOAP-TV (now KOPB-TV) in Portland. Southern Oregon was the only region of the state without public television.

However, channel 8 at Medford was not reserved for noncommercial applicants, and two commercial applicants also demonstrated interest in the channel. The Medford Printing Company owned the Mail Tribune newspaper and radio station KYCJ. A joint venture of Liberty Television, owners of KEZI in Eugene and several cable systems, and Medford-based Siskiyou Broadcasting, also filed. Both commercial groups sought to operate channel 8 as an ABC affiliate.

The FCC slated the applications from the Oregon Board of Higher Education, Medford Printing, and the Liberty/Siskiyou joint venture for hearing in December 1967, alongside an objection by the Southern Oregon Broadcasting Company, owner of KTVM channel 5, which believed a third commercial outlet in Medford would cause economic harm to its business. The state dropped out in May 1968, and after Medford Printing failed to respond, the commission awarded the construction permit to Liberty and Siskiyou in 1969.

Liberty and Siskiyou, however, were impeded from building the channel due to continued objections from KOBI (the former KTVM); the final petition for reconsideration from that station was denied in March 1971. Even after those were dismissed, Liberty hesitated to build the station, designated KSYS, which would have made Medford into the smallest market in the country with three commercial TV stations.

The owners of the two commercial stations in the area—Bill Smullin of KOBI and Ray Johnson of KMED-TV (now KTVL)—helped a new non-profit corporation, Southern Oregon Educational Company, buy the channel 8 construction permit from Liberty. (Liberty claimed the growth of cable TV in the region reduced the need for a third commercial outlet.) They also pledged payments of $50,000 once the station signed on. Getting the funds to buy necessary equipment proved more difficult than expected, presumably because the Department of Health, Education and Welfare (HEW) balked at donating to a non-profit that was backed by two commercial broadcasters.

With the FCC permit about to run out, KSYS went on the air on January 17, 1977 from a transmitter on the Jackson–Josephine county line with the strongest signal of any station in the region, at 191,000 watts. (The FCC redesignated channel 8 as reserved noncommercial in December 1977 and instead allocated channel 12 to Medford for a third network station, leading to the establishment of KDRV seven years later.)

Originally, Klamath Falls was served by a low-powered translator. In 1986, SOEC (later renamed Southern Oregon Public Television, Inc.) immediately applied for another full-power station to cover the Klamath Valley. It would be another three years before that station, KFTS, went on the air in January 1989 from a transmitter just south of the city.

The two stations are the only public television stations in the state not affiliated with OPB, but occasionally air some of OPB's programs. They also carry local, PBS, and American Public Television programs, along with programs from other distributors.

In December 2019, the station renamed itself to Southern Oregon PBS as part of a national initiative of PBS stations to clarify their roles in their communities.

Technical information

Subchannels
The stations' digital signals are multiplexed:

SO PBS also operates a cable-only channel on Charter Spectrum channel 8 in Medford, Ashland, Klamath Falls, Grants Pass and Brookings (channel 7 in Roseburg), featuring popular PBS programming at alternate times. SO PBS is also available on satellite providers in the region on channel 8. The secondary channel, World, is available on Spectrum channel 192, The third channel, Create, is carried on Spectrum channel 191, and the fourth channel, PBS Kids, is carried on Spectrum channel 193,

SO PBS is also one of the partners of The Oregon Channel, a public affairs network. Programming consists of Oregon legislative sessions and other public affairs events. It was previously featured also on the x.4 subchannel, until it was made exclusively available on cable.

Analog-to-digital conversion
SOPTV's stations shut down their analog signals on February 17, 2009, the original target date in which full-power television stations in the United States were to transition from analog to digital broadcasts under federal mandate (which was later pushed back to June 12, 2009). The station's digital channel allocations post-transition are as follows:
 KSYS shut down its analog signal, over VHF channel 8; the station's digital signal relocated from its pre-transition UHF channel 42 to VHF channel 8 due to problems caused by UHF's severe terrain limitations.
 KFTS shut down its analog signal, over UHF channel 22; the station's digital signal remained on its pre-transition UHF channel 33, using PSIP to display the station's virtual channel as its former UHF analog channel 22. In 2018, SOPTV transitioned from channel 42 down to channel 34 due to the federally-mandated television repack. (Despite this change, most television sets' metadata continues to show viewers receiving channel 8.)

Translators
KSYS is rebroadcast on the following translators:

References

External links

History of Television in Southern Oregon

PBS member networks
Television stations in Oregon
1977 establishments in Oregon